Román Mejías Gómez (August 9, 1925 – February 22, 2023) was a Cuban professional baseball outfielder.

Biography
Mejías was born to Manuel Mejías and Felipa Gómez in Manuelita Sugar Mill in the Las Villas province of Cuba; the MLB widely and consistently printed his birthplace as Abreus, Cuba. He had two younger sisters, Esperosa and Santa. When he was 17, he married Nicolasa Montero and the couple had two children, Rafaela and José. 

Mejías died in Menifee, California, on February 22, 2023, at the age of 97.

Major League career

Pittsburgh Pirates
Mejías began his professional career in the Pirates' farm system in 1953. He spent his entire rookie campaign of 1955 on the Pittsburgh roster, appearing in 71 games, 39 as a starting outfielder. Recalled by the Pirates in late May 1957, Mejías backed up the regular Pittsburgh outfield (left fielder Bob Skinner, center fielder Bill Virdon and right fielder Roberto Clemente), hitting a more robust .275.

Houston Colt .45s
On October 10, 1961, he was selected in the 11th round by Houston in the 1961 National League expansion draft, and was the starting right fielder in the Colt .45s' first Major League game on April 10, 1962.  Batting third in Houston's lineup, Mejías had three hits in five at bats, with three runs scored and six runs batted in.  He hit the first home run in Houston's Major League history, a three-run homer off Don Cardwell in the third inning, and then followed with another three-run blast in the eighth off relief pitcher Al Lary, as the Colt .45s routed the visiting Chicago Cubs, 11–2. Mejías held the Colts' starting right fielder job all season, appearing in a career-high 146 games, and led Houston in hits (162), home runs (24), runs batted in (76), batting average (.286), stolen bases (12) and slugging percentage (.485).

Boston Red Sox
On November 26, he was traded to the Red Sox for defending American League batting champion Pete Runnels.  In , Mejías was Boston's opening day center fielder, but batted.150 in 113 at bats during April and May. He did not get above .200 until June 22, and by then the often-injured Gary Geiger had taken over as the Bosox' center fielder.  Mejías recovered to bat .227 with 11 home runs, but he was relegated to a reserve on the 1964 Red Sox, playing behind left fielder Tony Conigliaro (a 19-year-old rookie), center fielder Carl Yastrzemski and right fielder Lee Thomas. He then was assigned to the Red Sox' Triple-A Toronto Maple Leafs affiliate, where he was a playing coach in 1965 before decamping for Japan, where he batted .288 with no home runs in 30 games in 1966, his last professional season. In 627 big-league games, Mejías collected 449 hits, with 57 doubles, 12 triples and 54 home runs. He batted .254.  As a minor leaguer, he hit .299 in 806 games played.

References

External links

The Román Mejías Page

1925 births
2023 deaths
Batavia Clippers players
Boston Red Sox players
Columbus Jets players
Cuban expatriate baseball players in Japan
Hollywood Stars players
Houston Colt .45s players
Major League Baseball outfielders
Major League Baseball players from Cuba
Cuban expatriate baseball players in the United States
Pittsburgh Pirates players
Sankei Atoms players
Toronto Maple Leafs (International League) players
Waco Pirates players
People from Cienfuegos Province